Chlidichthys inornatus is a species of fish in the family Pseudochromidae.

Description
Its body has an elongate appearance gently compressed laterally and with prominent eyes. Its body and fins coloration are going from bright yellow to soft grey.

Distribution & habitat
Chlidichthys inornatus is endemic from Sri Lanka, Chagos and Maldives archipelagos in the Indian Ocean.

Biology
Chlidichthys inornatus lives in couple always nearby a shelter on the reef in shallow water. Its diet is carnivorous and composed of small invertebrates and also small fish.

References

Randall, J.E. and C. Anderson, 1993. Annotated checklist of the epipelagic and shore fishes of the Maldives Islands. Ichthyol. Bull. of the J.L.B. Smith Inst. of Ichthyol. (59):1-47.

Pseudoplesiopinae
Taxa named by Roger Lubbock
Fish described in 1976